Beebe House and variations may refer to:

Beebe Homestead, Wakefield, Massachusetts, also known as Lucius Beebe House, listed on the National Register of Historic Places (NRHP) in Middlesex County
Beebe Estate, Melrose, Massachusetts, listed on the NRHP in Middlesex County
Dr. Ward Beebe House, Saint Paul, Minnesota, listed on the NRHP in Ramsey County
Horace Y. Beebe House, Ravenna, Ohio, listed on the NRHP in Portage County
Marcus Beebe House, Ipswich, South Dakota, listed on the NRHP in Edmunds County
George Angus and Martha Ansil Beebe House, Provo, Utah, listed on the NRHP in Utah County
Beebe Ranch, Chincoteague, Virginia, a noted horse ranch and museum in Accomack County
Beebe House (Platteville, Wisconsin), listed on the NRHP in Grant County

See also
Piper-Beebe House, Virginia City, Nevada, listed on the NRHP

Buildings and structures disambiguation pages